The 1966 NCAA University Division Tennis Championships were the 21st annual tournaments to determine the national champions of NCAA University Division men's singles, doubles, and team collegiate tennis in the United States.

USC captured the team championship, the Trojans' eighth such title. USC finished four points ahead of rivals, and defending champions, UCLA in the final team standings (27–23).

Host site
This year's tournaments were contested at the University of Miami in Miami, Florida.

Team scoring
Until 1977, the men's team championship was determined by points awarded based on individual performances in the singles and doubles events.

References

External links
List of NCAA Men's Tennis Champions

NCAA Division I tennis championships
NCAA Division I Tennis Championships
NCAA Division I Tennis Championships
NCAA University Division Tennis Championships